Nanna Hubba Bluff is a bluff above the Tombigbee River near Calvert in northeastern Mobile County, Alabama, United States.  The historic site is known to have been occupied by Native Americans at least as far back as 1000 BC, but gained its name from the historic-era Nanibas tribe.  The Nanibas (‘fish-eaters’) are believed by scholars to have been a Choctaw people.  They occupied a village here during the early 18th century, until they moved downstream to the vicinity of Fort Louis de la Mobile and were absorbed into the Mobile tribe.  Following the relocation of the Nanibas, the bluff came to be settled by early European settlers.  During the American Civil War the Confederacy had shipyards at the site.  It was added to the National Register of Historic Places on October 1, 1974, due to its historical importance.  Nanna Hubba Bluff was acquired by ThyssenKrupp in 2007, with the company building a new US$4.65 billion stainless and carbon steel facility on the site.

References

Archaeological sites on the National Register of Historic Places in Alabama
National Register of Historic Places in Mobile County, Alabama
Native American history of Alabama
Former populated places in Alabama
Archaeological sites in Alabama
Landforms of Mobile County, Alabama
Geography of Mobile County, Alabama
Cliffs of the United States